West Boulevard–Cudell (signed as West Boulevard) is a station on the RTA Red Line in Cleveland, Ohio. The station is located on the north side of Detroit Avenue (U.S. Route 6 Alternate) at the intersection with West Boulevard in Cleveland's Cudell neighborhood.

The station comprises a parking lot off Detroit Avenue with a station headhouse on the north side of the parking lot. The tracks and platform are located below the parking lot level. An enclosed bridge from the headhouse over the eastbound track leads to a stairway to the platform below.

Just west of the station, the Red Line leaves the right-of-way adjacent to the old Nickel Plate Road and goes through a cut to run southwest adjacent to the old New York Central main line.

History
The station opened when the CTS Rapid Transit opened on Cleveland's West Side on August 14, 1955 and was originally named West 98th–Detroit. In April 1999, RTA completed a $5.5-million reconstruction of the station.
The station was renamed “West Boulevard–Cudell” to reflect the Cudell neighborhood in which it is located.

Station layout

Notable places nearby
 Cudell Commons
 Shooting of Tamir Rice

Gallery

References

External links

Red Line (RTA Rapid Transit)
Railway stations in the United States opened in 1955
1955 establishments in Ohio